Richard Jude Ciccolella  (born November 30, 1947) is an American actor and singer. He is best known for playing Mike Novick in the television series 24 from 2001 to 2006.

Life and career
Ciccolella was born in Burlington, Vermont, and spent his formative years in Albany, New York. In 1969, he graduated from Brown University, where he acted in student productions. He studied at Temple University, earning a Master of Fine Arts degree in theatre.

His film debut was in the 1992 James Foley and David Mamet film Glengarry Glen Ross, as a detective in the scene where Al Pacino is having an argument with Kevin Spacey about the "six-thousand dollars" owed to him. His other early film roles include Mert in The Shawshank Redemption (1994), Jerry in Boys on the Side (1995), Lieutenant Wilson in Night Falls on Manhattan (1996), Romulan Commander Suran in Star Trek: Nemesis (2002), the private eye in Down with Love (2003), Karl Iverson in The Terminal (2004), and David Donovan in The Manchurian Candidate (2004). He also appeared as Lt. Liebowitz in Sin City (2005), a role he reprised nine years later for Sin City: A Dame to Kill For (2014).

Ciccolella's first television appearance was in the 1993 The Adventures of Pete & Pete episode "Tool and Die", as shop class teacher Mr. Slurm, whose missing left hand stirs nothing but hearsay and rumors. In 2001, Ciccolella appeared in a recurring guest role on 24 during the show's first and second seasons (2001–2003). He played Mike Novick, Chief of Staff to President David Palmer (Dennis Haysbert). In 2005, he guest starred as Principal Raymond on Everybody Hates Chris; however, he was replaced upon reprising his role as Mike Novick in the fourth season of 24 (2005), returning for the last 8 episodes. Mike had become an advisor to Acting President Charles Logan (Gregory Itzin), who had taken over after President John Keeler (Geoff Pierson) was critically injured. He continued this role in the show's fifth season (2006), but did not appear in the sixth season. He has also guest starred on the shows Law & Order, NYPD Blue, CSI: NY and ER.

In 2007, he guest-starred on NBC freshman drama, Life; and played Kenny in the film The Wager. He also portrayed Phillip Davenport, the fictional Secretary of the Navy, on the 6th season of the CBS show NCIS in 2008, and reprised the role two years later for the last episode of the 8th season.

In the "Supporting Players" featurette on the 24 season 5 DVD, actress Jean Smart reveals that Ciccolella is a folk singer.

Filmography

Film

Television

References

External links
  Official website
 
 

1947 births
Male actors from New York (state)
American male film actors
American male television actors
Living people
People from Nassau County, New York
Brown University alumni
American people of Italian descent